Route 350 is a highway in the Kansas City, Missouri, area. Its eastern terminus is at the Interstate 470/U.S. Route 50 (I-470/US 50) interchange in Lee's Summit; its western terminus is at I-435 in Kansas City. Along the northern terminus, it fades into Blue Parkway and  part of the route is an old alignment of US 50. Notable development along Route 350, particularly in and nearing Raytown, occurred in the late 1970s into the 1980s. However, much of this area now shows its age and the changing socioeconomic makeup of the area, with retail chains falling into disrepair or closing.

Major intersections

References

External links

350
U.S. Route 50
Transportation in Jackson County, Missouri
Transportation in Kansas City, Missouri
Transportation in the Kansas City metropolitan area